Korostelyovo is a rural locality (a village) in Vyatkinskoye Rural Settlement, Sudogodsky District, Vladimir Oblast, Russia. The population was 42 as of 2010.

Geography 
Korostelyovo is located 45 km northwest of Sudogda (the district's administrative centre) by road. Fryazino is the nearest rural locality.

References 

Rural localities in Sudogodsky District